Lawrence W. Jennings (October 4, 1917 – July 6, 1992) was an American Thoroughbred racehorse trainer whom the January 5, 1972 edition of The Miami News called "one of the most consistently successful horse trainers in the country."

Before becoming a racehorse trainer, Jennings graduated from Mount Saint Joseph High School in Baltimore and then went on to earn degrees from the University of Maryland, Baltimore County and Frostburg State University. Among his top-graded wins in Thoroughbred racing was a victory in the Monmouth Invitational Handicap with Delta Flag  and the Widener Handicap with Launch a Pegasus. His best result in the U.S. Triple Crown series was a second in the 1974 Preakness Stakes with Neapolitan Way.

Due to declining health, Lawrence Jennings retired in early 1992 having won more than 1,100 races during his 38 years as a trainer. He died of cancer on July 6 of that year. His son, Lawrence Jennings, Jr., followed in his father's footsteps and trained thoroughbreds for 23 years.  Lawrence W. Jennings, Jr. died in Florida on November 6, 2011.

References

1917 births
1992 deaths
Frostburg State University alumni
University of Maryland, Baltimore County alumni
American horse trainers
Sportspeople from Baltimore
Deaths from cancer in New York (state)